Daniela Porzio (6 June 1950–2 October 2017), also known by her married name Daniela Marzano, was a professional tennis player from Italy who was active in the 1970s.

During her career she reached the second round in singles at all four Grand Slam tournaments.  Her best Grand Slam result in doubles was reaching the semifinals at the 1978 French Open with her American partner Paula Smith, which they lost to eventual champions Mima Jaušovec and Virginia Ruzici.

Porzio was a member of the Italian Fed Cup team from 1971 to 1980 and had a 15–14 win–loss record.

After her playing career, she started coaching and became the first coach of Francesca Schiavone.

She was married to Italian tennis player Pietro Marzano.

References

External links
 
 
 

Italian female tennis players
1950 births
2017 deaths
Mediterranean Games silver medalists for Italy
Mediterranean Games medalists in tennis
Competitors at the 1979 Mediterranean Games